Plemyristis is a genus of moths belonging to the family Tineidae. It contains only one species, Plemyristis aphrochoa, which is found in India.

References

Tineidae
Monotypic moth genera
Moths of Asia
Tineidae genera
Taxa named by Edward Meyrick